In combinatorial game theory, cooling, heating, and overheating are operations on hot games to make them more amenable to the traditional methods of the theory,
which was originally devised for cold games in which the winner is the last player to have a legal move.
Overheating was generalised by Elwyn Berlekamp for the analysis of Blockbusting.
Chilling (or unheating) and warming are variants used in the analysis of the endgame of Go.

Cooling and chilling may be thought of as a tax on the player who moves, making them pay for the privilege of doing so,
while heating, warming and overheating are operations that more or less reverse cooling and chilling.

Basic operations: cooling, heating 
The cooled game  (" cooled by ") for a game   and a (surreal) number  is defined by
 .

Heating is the inverse of cooling and is defined as the "integral"

Multiplication and overheating 
Norton multiplication is an extension of multiplication to a game  and a positive game  (the "unit")
defined by
 

Overheating is an extension of heating used in Berlekamp's solution of Blockbusting,
 

Winning Ways also defines overheating of a game  by a positive game , as
 
 Note that in this definition numbers are not treated differently from arbitrary games.
 Note that the "lower bound" 0 distinguishes this from the previous definition by Berlekamp

Operations for Go: chilling and warming   
Chilling is a variant of cooling by  used to analyse the Go endgame of Go and is defined by
 
This is equivalent to cooling by  when  is an "even elementary Go position in canonical form".

In this case the previous definition simplifies to the form

References 

Combinatorial game theory